Anna Creek Station is the world's largest working cattle station. It is located in the Australian state of South Australia.

Description
It is  larger than its nearest rival, Alexandria Station in the country's Northern Territory.

The station is arid pastoral country. As of 16 December 2016, the station is owned by the Williams Cattle Company, a family business that bought Anna Creek from S. Kidman & Co, doubling their total area held under pastoral leases. The nearest township is William Creek (which is surrounded by the Anna Creek station), but the nearest town for freight is Coober Pedy.

History
The property was originally established in 1863 but moved to its current location in 1872. It was originally used for sheep, but due to losses from dingo attacks, they switched to cattle.

The land occupying the extent of the Anna Creek Station pastoral lease  was gazetted as a locality by the Government of South Australia on 26 April 2013  with the name 'Anna Creek'.

Anna Creek in the 2000s

Despite its size, in 2007 Anna Creek Station was carrying only 1,500 head of cattle due to the 2000s drought. In 2008, when the station was owned by S. Kidman and Co Ltd, there were eight full-time staff and they were destocking all their cattle. Following floods in 2010, conditions improved and the station restocked. It had 10,000 head of cattle in May 2011 and is capable of carrying up to 16,500 head of cattle during a good season. They raise Santa Gertrudis cattle as they are suitable for hot, dry climates.

In mid April 2016, it was announced that the South Australian cattle company Williams Cattle Company was to acquire Anna Creek from S Kidman & Co, subject to approval by the Foreign Investment Review Board of the sale of the remainder of the Kidman holding to a consortium led by the Chinese group Dakang Australia Holdings. Federal Treasurer Scott Morrison blocked the sale later that month, in the national interest. Anna Creek is located in a weapons testing range. Morrison had previously blocked the sale of Kidman to related Chinese company, Pengxin Group.  In December, Anna Creek was finally sold to the South Australian family business Williams Cattle Company, at an estimated $16 million, while the rest of the Kidman empire was sold to a consortium comprising mining magnate Gina Rinehart's Hancock Prospecting, owning 67%, and the Chinese company Shanghai CRED, owning 33%. The Williams family planned to invest heavily in new waters and trucking yards in order to facilitate an increase in the number of stock carried on the station.

Life at Anna Creek 
There is a main homestead at Anna Creek and an outstation at The Peake. Although the homesteads are very isolated, they have satellite telecommunications including television and internet. The Coober Pedy Oodnadatta One Day Mail Run delivers mail twice a week and can bring a small amount of freight. The Peake Ruins, including those of a former telegraph office, cemetery, mine site and lime kilns at the outstation, are listed on the South Australian Heritage Register. The Strangways Springs Telegraph Station Ruins on the station are also listed on the Heritage Register.

Once there was a large workforce of stockmen at Anna Creek, who mustered the cattle on horses. Today light aircraft are used for spotting animals which are rounded up by stockmen riding motorbikes, requiring a much smaller workforce.

See also
List of ranches and stations
List of the largest stations in Australia

References 

Stations (Australian agriculture)
Pastoral leases in South Australia
Far North (South Australia)
1863 establishments in Australia
Lime kilns in Australia